Grossberg network is an artificial neural network introduced by Stephen Grossberg. It is a self organizing, competitive network based on continuous time. Grossberg, a neuroscientist and a biomedical engineer, designed this network based on the human visual system.

Shunting model 
The shunting model is one of Grossberg's neural network models, based on a Leaky integrator, described by the differential equation
,

At equilibrium (where ), the activation  reaches the value
.

References 

Artificial neural networks